Dichomeris specularis is a moth in the family Gelechiidae. It was described by Edward Meyrick in 1918. It is found in southern India and Sri Lanka.

The forewings are pale grey with a dark fuscous dot in the disc at one-fourth. The stigmata are dark fuscous, with the plical beneath the first discal and a dorsal dot beneath the second discal. There is also a curved or bent whitish line from three-fourths of the costa to the tornus, with the apical area beyond this dark purplish grey. The hindwings are grey.

References

Moths described in 1918
specularis